The Swedish Graphic Workers' Union (Grafiska or GF) was a trade union representing printing industry workers in Sweden.

The union was founded when the Swedish Bookbinders' Union merged with the Swedish Lithographic Union and the Swedish Typographers' Union.  The merger was agreed at a congress held in Stockholm on 17 August 1972, and the new union was formed on 1 January 1973.  Like all its predecessors, GF affiliated to the Swedish Trade Union Confederation.

On foundation, the union had 33,162 members, and this grew to a peak of 40,491 in 1989.  Membership then declined, in line with employment in the industry, and by 2008 it was down to only 17,251.  In 2009, it merged with the Swedish Forest and Wood Workers' Union, to form GS.

Presidents
1987: Valter Carlsson
1995: Malte Eriksson
2003: Jan Österlind
2007: Tommy Andersson

External links

References

Printing trade unions
Trade unions established in 1973
Trade unions disestablished in 2009
Trade unions in Sweden